Postal museum is a Sri Lanka's national museum of post that located at the Postal Headquarters in Colombo, Sri Lanka. Firstly, the postal museum was functioned at the Central Telegraph Office during 1918–1925, and moved to General Post Office in 1994. Again, a national postal museum was opened on 6 July 2010.

The museum has basic information on Dutch period post offices, rare stamps, equipment, pillar boxes, etc. Overall, the museum gives the picture of Sri Lanka Post's history.

See also 
List of museums in Sri Lanka
Postage stamps and postal history of Sri Lanka

References

External links 
 President inaugurates new Postal Museum in Sri Lanka

Museums in Colombo
Postal museums
Philately of Sri Lanka